The 2009 European Junior Baseball Championship was an international baseball competition held at Baseballstadion Bonn-Rheinaue in Bonn, Germany from August 3 to August 9, 2009. It features teams from Belgium, Czech Republic, France, Germany, Italy, Netherlands, Russia, Slovakia, Spain and Ukraine.

In the end, the team from Italy won the tournament.

Group stage

Pool A

Standings

Game results

Pool B

Standings

Game results

Final round

Pool C

Standings

Game results

5th place

Semi-finals

3rd place

Final

Final standings

External links
Official Website Host
Game Results

References

European Junior Baseball Championship
2009
European Junior Baseball Championship